Thạnh Hóa is a rural district of Long An province in the Mekong Delta region of Vietnam. As of 2003 the district had a population of 52,691. The district covers an area of 455 km². The district capital lies at Thạnh Hóa.

Divisions
The district is divided into the following communes:
Thạnh Hóa (urban), Thủy Đông, Thủy Tây, Tân Đông, Tân Tây, Thạnh Phước, Thạnh Phú, Thuận Nghĩa Hòa, Thuận Bình, Thạnh An and Tân Hiệp.

References

Districts of Long An province